Nacho Barahona (born in Madrid - 1970) is a Spanish film editor with over 225 TV series episodes, 14 short films, numerous advertisements and 3 documentaries to his credit, as well as 8 nominations and awards in film-making.

Biography
Barahona received a bachelor's degree in software engineering, at Madrid's Polytechnic University. He went to work as computer programmer and systems analyst in videogames, telecommunications and banking for large companies.

Attracted by the huge development of graphical applications and CAD, a career change resulted in training first as an advertisement graphic designer and graphic designer for multi-media platforms, interactive sites and virtual simulators, working with various Spanish universities.

In 1996, Barahona learned more about using Avid as a non-linear editing tool, and redirected his professional career towards editing in the world of advertising, collaborating with production companies such as 'Molinare', 'Dalton's Digital Brothers', 'Videospot', 'Full Fiction', 'Escosura', 'Videoreport', 'Propaganda Moviebox', 'Viva Video', 'Alaska Producciones', 'Genlock videoproducciones', 'Exa', '101', 'Telson', 'Resonancia Madrid', 'Com 4 hd' or 'Iconica'.

In 1998, he came into contact with TV fiction through the production company Globomedia (market leader in South America and second in Europe), and developed his career as a cinematographic editor, working on several of the most successful primetime Spanish TV series such as '7 vidas (Telecinco)', 'Javier ya no vive solo' (Telecinco), 'Los Serrano' (Telecinco), 'Compañeros (Antena 3)' and 'Policías, en el corazón de la calle' (Antena 3).

In 2004 he was signed up with the production company Videomedia to work on 'Lobos' (Antena 3) and 'Hospital Central' (Telecinco). After three successful seasons, in December, 2005 he was signed up with the production company Sony Pictures Television International to work on 'Los Simuladores', Spanish remake of the successful Argentine serie for channel Cuatro.

Filmography

Television

Short films

External links

Spanish film editors
Living people
People from Madrid
Polytechnic University of Madrid alumni
1970 births